The Alliance of Independent Social Democrats (abbr. СНСД or SNSD) is a Serb political party in Bosnia and Herzegovina. Founded in 1996, it is the governing party in Republika Srpska, with its leader, Milorad Dodik, serving as the current president of Republika Srpska. The party's vice-president, Željka Cvijanović, is the current member of the Presidency of Bosnia and Herzegovina, while SNSD member Radovan Višković is the current prime minister of Republika Srpska.

The creation of the SNSD can be traced back to the Independent Members of Parliament Group, which eventually grew to become the Party of Independent Social Democrats. During this time, the party served as the only opposition to the dominance of the ultra-nationalist Serb Democratic Party (SDS), which was led by Radovan Karadžić for the majority of the 1990s. The SNSD was seen as a moderate and non-extremist alternative to the SDS, with many of its members, including Dodik, being part of the former non-nationalist and multi-ethnic Union of Reform Forces of Yugoslavia.

The SNSD's first real electoral success was recorded in 2006, where it won 41 of the 83 seats in the National Assembly of Republika Srpska, attracting 44.95% of the popular vote. Since then, the party has gradually abandoned its reformist ideology for a more aggressive advocacy of Serbian nationalism, threatening the secession of Republika Srpska from the rest of Bosnia and Herzegovina numerous times. This has also led to the party being expelled from the Socialist International in 2012 for continuing to "espouse a nationalist and extremist" line.

History

1991–1996
The party grew out of the Independent Members of Parliament Caucus (IMPC), known as "the club", of the National Assembly of Republika Srpska (NSRS) in 1996. The club was in opposition to the Serb Democratic Party (SDS) during the Bosnian War (1992–96). The IMPC was established from the caucus of ethnic Serb members of the Parliament of the Socialist Republic of Bosnia and Herzegovina elected in 1990 from the election list of the Union of Reform Forces. The Serb members of the Parliament of SR Bosnia and Herzegovina, the majority of the Serb Democratic Party (SDS), including the members of the IMPC, established the Assembly of the Serb People of Bosnia and Herzegovina on 24 October 1991 (later renamed National Assembly of the Republika Srpska), following the majority of the parliament (mostly Croats and Bosniaks) approved the "Memorandum on Sovereignty" on 15 October 1991. In 1992, the Bosnian parliament held an independence referendum which led to the declaration of the Republic of Bosnia and Herzegovina.

The absolute majority of the newly founded NSRS was from the SDS. The IMPC was the only parliamentary opposition from the founding of the National Assembly through the first post-war elections in September 1996. The Party of Independent Social Democrats (SNSD) participated in the elections in the "Union for Peace and Progress" coalition along with the Socialist Party of RS (SPRS) and a minor party. The club and later party (SNSD) was chaired by Milorad Dodik.

1997–2004 
By the time of the next local elections in 1997, about twenty municipal committees had been formed, and it ran independently in 24 municipalities of the Republic of Srpska, mainly in Krajina and Posavina. In 1997, there was a split in the Serb Democratic Party, in which Biljana Plavšić, the president of Repubika Srpska left the party following internal clashes. The People’s Assembly of Republika Srpska was dissolved and parliamentary elections were held simultaneously with local elections. The Party of Independent Social Democrats received twice as much support compared to the previous elections just a year earlier. The then western-backed Plavšić nominated Dodik for Prime Minister and he was elected in the January 1998 elections, largely being seen as a moderate. In the party's early years it was active in the "Sloga" (freedom) coalition with Plavšić's Serb National Alliance and the Socialist Party, whose leader at the time was Živko Radišić. In 1998 another parliamentary election was held. In the elections for the People’s Assembly of Republika Srpska, the Party of Independent Social Democrats won 6 parliamentary seats.

1999 was marked by difficulties in the region, including the NATO bombing of Yugoslavia and internal strife with the blockade of the work of the Government by the People’s Assembly, a vote of no-confidence and the removal of Nikola Poplašen from the post of President of Republika Srpska by the High Representative Carlos Westendorp. Meanwhile the government led by Dodik received significant support from international institutions.

In December 1999 the Social Liberal Party of Republika Srpska merged into the SNSD, and after local elections in 2000 Nikola Špirić's Democratic Socialist Party (DSP) merged into it in 2001. The SNSD then changed its name to the "Alliance of Independent Social Democrats", keeping its old abbreviation. DSP was a splinter party of the SPRS. At the Unifying Congress in May 2002, it elected Milorad Dodik as president of the Alliance of Independent Social Democrats, with Nebojša Radmanović as president of the Executive Committee. Vinko Đuragić's New Workers' Party also joined the Alliance of Independent Social Democrats. In August 2002, the New Labour Party of Republika Srpska merged into the SNSD.

In the elections held on 5 October 2002, the Alliance of Independent Social Democrats won the largest number of parliamentary seats since its creation, receiving 19 seats in the People’s Assembly of Republika Srpska, 3 deputies in the Parliament of Bosnia and Herzegovina, and 1 deputy in the Parliamentary Assembly of the Federation of Bosnia and Herzegovina. The Alliance of Independent Social Democrats received 7 seats in the Council of Peoples of Republika Srpska and 3 seats in the Council of Peoples of the Federation of Bosnia and Herzegovina. Moderate political parties were offered a partnership to form a new government, but the Party of Democratic Progress decided to remain in the pact with the nationalist parties, so the Alliance of Independent Social Democrats accepted the role of the strongest opposition party, not only in the Republic of Srpska, but throughout Bosnia and Herzegovina.

In this period, the party launched a campaign to collect signatures, with the goal of abolishing conscription into the army and demilitarization of the country.

In the 2004 elections, with around 125,000 votes, the Alliance of Independent Social Democrats became the strongest party in Republika Srpska and the second in terms of votes in Bosnia and Herzegovina. 17 mayor positions were won, 15 of which were in Republika Srpska, and 2 in the Federation of Bosnia and Herzegovina. The number of council seats, compared to the previous local elections four years earlier was much higher, and they were won in all candidate municipalities in Republika Srpska, and in 9 municipalities in the Federation of Bosnia and Herzegovina. After the establishment of municipal assemblies, the Alliance of Independent Social Democrats has 22 municipal presidents, and a larger number of deputy mayors and vice presidents of municipal assemblies.

The end of 2004 was marked by the resignation of the republican government headed by Dragan Mikerević. After an unsuccessful two-year mandate, the Government resigns, and the political parties of the Republic of Srpska reach an Agreement on coordinated political action, with the aim of defining the strategic relationship towards the constitutional arrangement and upcoming reforms: police and defense.

2006–present: Breakthrough and rule 
At the beginning of 2006, the previous prime minister of Republic of Srpska, Pero Bukejlović, resigned. Ten days after that, on 26 January 2006, the president of Republic of Srpska, Dragan Čavić, asked Milorad Dodik to form a new government, in which, according to the Constitution, there are 16 ministers: eight Serbs, five Bosniaks and three Croats. The Parliament of Republika Srpska supported the appointment of Dodik as Prime Minister on 28 February 2006.

The Alliance of Independent Social Democrats achieved their breakthrough in the 2006 general elections in Bosnia and Herzegovina. Nebojša Radmanović was elected as the Serb member of the Presidency of Bosnia and Herzegovina. In the House of Representatives of Bosnia and Herzegovina, the Alliance of Independent Social Democrats won 7 seats with 269,468 votes ahead of the Party of Democratic Action with 238,474 (9 seats) and the Party for Bosnia and Herzegovina with 219,477 votes (8 seats). Milan Jelić became the President of Republika Srpska (271,022 votes, 48.87%). The party won 41 out of 83 parliamentary seats in the People’s Assembly of Republika Srpska, and Milorad Dodik, the president of the Alliance of Independent Social Democrats, became the representative for the composition of the new Republika Srpska government. In the House of Representatives of the Federation of Bosnia and Herzegovina, the Alliance of Independent Social Democrats won 1 place with 12,564 votes (1.46%). The Alliance of Independent Social Democrats won 3 out of 25 seats in the Assembly of Canton 10 in the Federation of Bosnia and Herzegovina (3,654 votes, 11.99%).

In the General Elections of 2010, the Alliance of Independent Social Democrats repeated their good result from 2006, and at all levels defeated the united opposition in the coalition Zajedno za Srpska (Serb Democratic Party-Party of Democratic Progress-Serb Radical Party of Republic of Srpska).

The joint candidate of the "Alliance of Independent Social Democrats-Democratic People's Alliance-Socialist Party" coalition for the Serb member of the Presidency of Bosnia and Herzegovina, Nebojša Radmanović, received 295,629 votes, i.e. 48.92% of the total number of valid votes. The most significant opponent, the candidate of the Zajedno za Srpska coalition, Mladen Ivanić, received 285,951 votes, or 47.31% of valid votes. A large number of invalid ballots, and a small difference between the two most important candidates, resulted in a complaint by Mladen Ivanić and his Party of Democratic Progress about irregularities during the counting of ballots. The Central Election Commission put an end to such doubts by recognizing the election results.

Milorad Dodik, the candidate of the coalition "Alliance of Independent Social Democrats-Democratic People's Alliance-Socialist Party" for the president of Republika Srpska achieved a convincing victory, receiving the support of 50.52% of voters, i.e. 319,618 valid votes.

In the elections for the People’s Assembly of the Republic of Srpska, the party won 38% of the valid votes cast (240,727 votes) and received 37 parliamentary mandates, which was enough for the party to preserve the parliamentary majority in the coalition with the Democratic People's Alliance and the Socialist Party.

In the elections for the Parliamentary Assembly of Bosnia and Herzegovina, the party in the Republic of Srpska won 43.30% of the votes, or 8 representatives.

The 2014 general elections saw the SNSD enter the race with a coalition of smaller parties; the Democratic People's Alliance and the Socialist Party. The SNSD became the main ruling party of Republika Srpska for the third consecutive time, gaining 29 seats in the Assembly with Dodik re-elected.

After the 2018 general elections, for the Serb member of the Presidency, Dodik received a record number of votes, i.e. 368,210 votes or 53.88%, while candidate Alliance for Victory Mladen Ivanić received 292,065 or 42.74%. In the People’s Assembly of Republika Srpska, SNSD remained the strongest political entity with 218,201 (31.87%) votes and 28 seats.

Ideology
Reflecting a trend in Eastern Europe for centre-left parties, it has been characterized as a social-democratic party with left-leaning views on fiscal issues, while having more conservative views on social issues. Since then, the party has gradually abandoned its reformist ideology and confederalism for Russophilia and a more aggressive advocacy of Serbian nationalism and separatism, threatening a proposed secession of Republika Srpska from the rest of Bosnia and Herzegovina numerous times. This has also led to the party being expelled from the Socialist International in 2012 for continuing to "espouse a nationalist and extremist" line.

List of presidents

Electoral results

Parliamentary elections

Presidential elections

Positions held 
Major positions held by Alliance of Independent Social Democrats members:

Notes

References

Bibliography

External links
Official website
Youth of SNSD

Alliance of Independent Social Democrats
Political parties in Bosnia and Herzegovina